Michael Jibson (born 16 December 1980) is an English actor, director, writer and voice over artist.

Jibson started his career in the theatre. He has been nominated for an Olivier Award twice, once when he was only 22 in 2003, for his work on the West End musical Our House, and again in 2018, when he won the award for his role of King George III in the original London production of the smash hit Broadway Musical
Hamilton.

He is known for being a versatile actor, with a theatrical career that jumps between Musical Theatre, modern and classical theatre, taking lead roles musicals in the West End and leading roles at the Royal Shakespeare Company, the Donmar Warehouse, Shakespeares Globe and the Almeida Theatre.

His many film roles include roles in blockbusters such as Star Wars: The Last Jedi, Beauty and the Beast, and Les Misérables, but also more intimate drama such as the independent film The Lighthouse, which is a psychological thriller based on a real event in 1801 which became known as the Smalls Lighthouse incident. Jibson wrote, produced, and starred in the film, which won a Welsh BAFTA.

His work in television is equally varied, with numerous television roles such as Four Lives, based on the true story Stephen Port murders, James Graham's Quiz, about the 2001 Who Wants to Be a Millionaire scandal and No Return, in which he stars in the role of a father whose son is accused of sexual assault on holiday in Turkey.

He is a patron of the National Youth Music Theatre and, remaining close to the area where he grew up and his roots he is also the patron of the Hessle Theatre Company, the place where he first took to the stage in 1994.

Jibson founded the Hull and East Yorkshire Arts and Culture Trust (HEYACT) to support and foster the arts in Hull and East Yorkshire, encouraging production companies to utilise the region for projects in order to create jobs and confidence and in particular to provide opportunities and encourage young people of all backgrounds into the arts and culture sector.

In 2022 Jibson was awarded an Honorary Doctor of Letters Degree from the University of Hull.

Early life
Jibson grew up in Hessle and attended Hessle High School.

He made his West End debut at the age of 14 in as a member of Fagin's Gang in Oliver! at the London Palladium, directed by Sam Mendes. He went on to join the National Youth Music Theatre of which he is now a patron. He later trained at the Guildford School of Acting, where he obtained a BA Hons (Musical Theatre) degree in 2002.
His father, Tim Jibson, is the director of Adventures In Radio based in Hull and was a DJ on BBC Radio Humberside, Viking Radio and the Launch Director and Director of Programmes at KCFM. His mother Evelyn is a retired receptionist. His brother is an actor/director and producer Paul Jibson.

Career

Theatre work
In 2003, when Michael was 22, he was nominated for a Laurence Olivier Award for Best Actor in a Musical for his performance as Joe Casey in the Madness/Tim Firth musical Our House directed by Matthew Warchus.

Other theatre work includes Brighton Rock at the Almeida Theatre, playing the lead role of Pinkie Brown, directed by Michael Attenborough in 2004. He played various roles in the Royal Shakespeare Company's adaptation of The Canterbury Tales. He played the role of Charles Lindbergh in Take Flight at the Menier Chocolate Factory in 2007. (nominated for a Theatregoer's Choice award for Best Supporting Actor in a Musical). He played the dual roles of Puck and Philostrate in A Midsummer Night's Dream directed by Jonathan Munby at Shakespeare's Globe in 2008,<ref>Fisher, Philip. [https://www.britishtheatreguide.info/reviews/MSNDglobe-rev.htm A Midsummer Night's Dream'''] britishtheatreguide.info, 2008</ref> where he also appeared as the Painter in Timon of Athens directed by Lucy Bailey. He played Dromio of Syracuse in Roxana Silbert's production of A Comedy of Errors at the Manchester Royal Exchange Theatre in 2010.

He returned to the Menier Chocolate Factory in 2011, where he played Addison Mizner in the European premiere of Stephen Sondheim and John Weidman's Road Show, directed by John Doyle. He played Jimmy in Roots at the Donmar Warehouse in 2013, directed by James Macdonald.

He played the role of King George III in the Original London cast of Hamilton winning the 2018 Olivier Award for Best Actor in a Supporting Role in a Musical.

Film work
Jibson's film work includes Flyboys (2006), The Bank Job, Lecture 21 (also titled Lesson 21) (2008), Red Mist (2009), Devils Bridge, Cemetery Junction, Panic Button, the factory foreman in the film version of Les Misérables,  A Viking Saga: The Darkest Day, Hammer of the Gods, The Fifth Estate, Good People, The Riot Club, Beauty and the Beast, Star Wars: The Last Jedi (2017), Hunter Killer (2018), 1917 (2019), To Olivia (2021) and Last Night in Soho (2021) .

In 2014, Jibson co-wrote the independent film The Lighthouse, based the tragic story of the Smalls Lighthouse in 1801. The Lighthouse is the story of two Lighthouse keepers, Thomas Howell and Thomas Griffith who were stranded on The Smalls Islands, a small cluster of rocks approximately 20 miles (32 km) west of the Pembrokeshire coast in Wales. Jibson also starred as Thomas Howell opposite Welsh actor Mark Lewis Jones. The feature film was written and then selected by the Welsh Ffilm Cymru emerging talent scheme Cinematic and awarded a budget of £300,000 in conjunction with the British Film Institute (BFI), BBC Films, S4C and Soda Pictures. The film received a cinematic release in Wales and was released on DVD and VOD in 2016 in the UK, receiving positive reviews. " The Lighthouse is a welcome beacon of quality in a genre often happy to rely on cheap tricks and easy scares and offers so much more, amply rewarding those who are willing to embrace its blunt and brittle world" – Starburst. It was nominated for five Welsh BAFTAS (including best film), winning one for VFX.

Television work
Jibson's television work includes Phamer McCoy in the 2012 Primetime Emmy Awards winning 2012 US miniseries Hatfields & McCoys, directed by Kevin Reynolds and starring Kevin Costner and Bill Paxton, BBC Four film Burton & Taylor, alongside Helena Bonham Carter and Dominic West; The Thirteenth Tale starring Vanessa Redgrave and Olivia Colman – both for the BBC, Tubby and Enid, directed by Victoria Wood for the BBC, Father Brown BBC and Galavant for ABC.

In 2015 Jibson received rave reviews for portraying the English military officer Myles Standish in Saints & Strangers, a US TV movie for the National Geographic Channel and Sony Pictures. The Hollywood Reporter reviewer wrote: "The mini's MVP, however, is Michael Jibson as the Pilgrims' iconic military adviser, Myles Standish. His commanding performance strikes just the right balance between the mythical and the credible, as if he somehow instilled an animatronic Disneyland automaton with a stirringly virile essence". Saints & Strangers chronicled the real story of the Pilgrims, including their harrowing voyage from England to America aboard the Mayflower and settling in Plymouth, Massachusetts. It was directed by Paul A. Edwards.

In 2020 Michael played Tecwen Whittock in James Graham‘s   Quiz, directed by Stephen Frears.

In 2021 Michael portrayed the infamous Rudolf II in the second season of Sky One's television drama A Discovery of Witches, which is based upon Deborah Harkness' book series of the same name.

Michael played DS Stuart Reeves in the 2020 miniseries Honour which was based on the real life murder of Banaz Mahmod.

After that 2021 saw him portray Cary Hemings in Season 2 of Sky One's political thriller Cobra.

in 2022 Michael played DC Paul Slaymaker in Four Lives for the BBC. It received positive reviews and Hugo Rifkind in The Times wrote, "All of the cast were strong, but Michael Jibson deserves particular credit as a hopelessly obstructive family liaison officer. The human embodiment of computer says 'no'."''

In 2022 Michael played Matthew Evansford in the Apple TV+ mini series The Essex Serpent, starring Claire Danes and Tom Hiddleston, which was directed by Clio Barnard.

Personal life
Jibson is married to actress Caroline Sheen.  The couple have one daughter, Flora, born in 2012.

Filmography

Film

Television

References

External links
 
Official website

1980 births
Living people
English male stage actors
English male film actors
Male actors from Kingston upon Hull